Stade Régional Saifoullaye Diallo is a multi-use stadium in Labé, Guinea.  It is currently used mostly for football matches, on club level by Fello Star of the Guinée Championnat National. The stadium has a capacity of 5,000 spectators.

References

Football venues in Guinea